Magasa is a town and comune in the province of Brescia, in Lombardy in northern Italy.

Historical and cultural profile
In position on the plateau of Denai, in the Valley of Vestino, inland of Lake of Garda, rises the small village of Magasa, whose origins go back to the Celtics; they called the place mag, the field. The Stoni and the Gallic Cenomani, then the Romans and the Lombards lived here. The Lodrone family established in Magasa from 1200 to 1807; then, for centuries, this has been nobody's land. It became part of Italy in 1919, Magasa was separated from Trentino in 1934, and became a hamlet of Turano.

The ancient administrative autonomy of 1589, was achieved again in 1947. The abundance of pastures has always been significant for the village economy, dedicated to cattle raising that survives, still today, in summer mountain barns, with production of milk, from which famous cheeses and butter are obtained, The historical core is a crossing of small passages with peasants' high and narrow houses; the church is dedicated to Sant'Antonio Abate, mid 18th century.

Inside, the religious building is characterized by the floor in red and yellow stones from the Denervo mountain. The pleasant hamlet of Cadria is surrounded by a magic natural atmosphere; the people are proud of their small church of San Lorenzo. The church, of allegedly of Lombards origins, was restored in 1547 and is the pilgrimage arrival on occasion of the patron's day, 10 August. An ancient ritual is renewed, instituted by testament in 1588, with the distribution to every participant to the religious celebration of one piece of bread and fifth of wine.

Today, the village of Magasa is the owner of the church and it is morally engaged to comply with the original benefactor's desire to renew the tradition. The bright sky of Cima Rest, free from any pollution, has allowed the association Astrofili di Salò to arrange an Astronomical public observatory.

The haylofts of Cima Rest
The straw-roofed haylofts of plateau Denai and Cima Rest are mentioned for the first time in a document dated 1613. Some historians have established a link between their constructive type and some low Middle Age constructions; other say that Lombards from Hungary built them in 600 a. D.

Their unique architecture is a true masterpiece of efficiency and economy. The steep roof in wheat straw is waterproof. In order not to lose the memory of the places and local culture, one of the haylofts of Cima Rest has become the Ethnographic Museum of the Valvestino.

Municipality

Mayor: Federico Venturini
Election: 30 March 2010
Party: Lista Civica
Tel.:  0365 745010
EmailComune: info@comune-magasa-bs.it
Vice-mayor: Tommaso Mazza
Fax: 0365 74049
Biblioteca Comunale: via Giuseppe Garibaldi, 1

Mayors 1948–
1948–60, Giuseppe Zeni, Lista Civica;
1960–64, Angelo Gamba, Lista Civica;
1965, Andrea De Rossi, commissario prefettizio;
1965–72, Fioravante Gottardi, Lista Civica;
1972–75, Dino Venturini, Lista Civica;
1975–80, Antonio Zeni, Lista Civica;
1980–91, Evaristo Venturini, Lista civica;
1991–99, Giorgio Venturini, Lista Civica;
1999–2000, Zaira Romano, commissario prefettizio;
2000–05, Ermenegildo Venturini, Lista Civica.
2005–10,     Ermenegildo Venturini, Lista Civica
2010–          Federico Venturini, Lista Civica

Festival and events

 Feast of Alpine troops in  August;
 Feast of the cheese in Cima Rest in September.

References

Bibliography
  Bruno Festa, Boschi, fienili e malghe - Magasa tra il XVI e il XX secolo, Grafo edizioni, Brescia 1998;
  Nicola Gallinaro ed Elio Della Ferrera, Terra tra due laghi, Consorzio Forestale della Valvestino, Sondrio 2004;
  Gianpaolo Zeni, "En Merica!" - L'emigrazione della gente di Magasa e Val Vestino in America, Comune e Biblioteca di Magasa, Bagnolo Mella 2005;
  Gianpaolo Zeni, La guerra delle Sette Settimane. La campagna garibaldina del 1866 sul fronte di Magasa e Val Vestino, Comune e Biblioteca di Magasa, Bagnolo Mella 2006;
  Vito Zeni, La valle di Vestino - Appunti di storia locale, Fondazione Civiltà Bresciana 1993.
  Gianpaolo Zeni, Al servizio dei Lodron. La storia di sei secoli di intensi rapporti tra le comunità di Magasa e Val Vestino e la nobile famiglia dei Conti di Lodrone, Comune e Biblioteca di Magasa, Bagnolo Mella 2007.